David Ibukun Ajiboye (born 28 September 1998) is an English professional footballer who plays as a winger or striker for EFL League Two club Sutton United on loan from EFL League One side Peterborough United

Born in Bromley, Ajiboye joined Brighton & Hove Albion as a scholar in 2015 and had a loan spell with Worthing in 2017. He was released by Brighton in summer 2018 having failed to make an appearance for the club, and joined former loan club Worthing. After a season at Worthing, he joined Sutton United of the National League, and was promoted EFL League Two with the club in 2021.

Career

Early career
Born in Bromley, Aljiboye signed for Brighton & Hove Albion on a two-year scholarship in 2015. He had a loan spell at Worthing in the Isthmian League Premier Division in 2017, where he made 2 appearances. He made his EFL Trophy debut for Brighton & Hove Albion U21 on 29 August 2017 in a 2–0 defeat to Milton Keynes Dons. In January 2018, he joined Millwall U23 on loan for the remainder of the season. He was released by Brighton in summer 2018 and signed for former loan club Worthing shortly after. He scored 21 goals in 45 games for Worthing across the 2018–19 season.

Sutton United
In summer 2019, Ajiboye signed for Sutton United of the National League. He scored 4 goals in 37 league appearances during the 2019–20 campaign, which was ended prematurely due to the COVID-19 pandemic. Sutton United were promoted to EFL League Two as champions of the National League at the end of the 2020–21 season, with Ajiboye having scored 5 times during that league campaign. On 29 June 2021, it was announced that Ajiboye had signed a new contract with the club with his previous contract about to expire. He was named in the National League Team of the Season for the 2020–21 season.

He made his League Two debut on 7 August 2021 in a 2–1 defeat to Forest Green Rovers. He scored his first goal of the season on 28 August 2021 in a 2–1 home defeat to Oldham Athletic.

Peterborough United
On 22 June 2022, Ajiboye signed for League One club Peterborough United for an undisclosed fee, signing a three-year contract with the club.

On 30 December 2022, Ajiboye was announced to have returned to Sutton United on loan until the end of the 2022–23, a deal becoming active from 1 January.

Personal life
Born in England, Ajiboye is of Nigerian and Jamaican descent.

Style of play
Ajiboye plays as a winger or as a striker.

Career statistics

Honours
Sutton United
National League: 2020–21
EFL Trophy runner-up: 2021–22

Individual
National League Team of the Year: 2020–21

References

External links

1998 births
Living people
English footballers
Footballers from Bromley
English people of Nigerian descent
Association football midfielders
Brighton & Hove Albion F.C. players
Millwall F.C. players
Worthing F.C. players
Sutton United F.C. players
Peterborough United F.C. players
English Football League players
National League (English football) players
Isthmian League players
Black British sportsmen